A knowbot is a kind of bot that collects information by automatically gathering certain specified information from web sites.

KNOWBOT is the acronym for Knowledge-Based Object Technology.  This term, used as early as 1988 and known to have been implemented by December 1989 at the latest describes computer-based objects developed for collecting and storing specific information, in order to use that information to accomplish a specific task, and to enable sharing that information with other objects or processes. An early use of knowbots was to provide a computerized assistant to users to complete redundant detailed tasks without a need to train the user in computer technology.

See also
 Knowbot Information Service
 Web crawler, a program that visits Web sites and gathers information according to some generalized criteria (opposed to user-specified criteria) and subsequently indexes it

References 

Internet bots
Computer-related introductions in 1988